Miranda Sex Garden are an English music group from London. They were originally active from 1990 to 2000, reforming in 2022.

Biography 
Formed in 1990, Katharine Blake, Kelly McCusker and Jocelyn West were originally a trio of madrigal singers. They were educated at The Purcell School for Young Musicians in Bushey. They were discovered by Barry Adamson when they were singing madrigals on Portobello Road in London. He invited them to sing on his Delusion soundtrack, with the song Il Solitario. After that Daniel Miller invited them to sign a contract with Mute Records. They recorded their first single Gush Forth My Tears in March 1991. It was a madrigal with a beat, mixed by Danny Rampling. Their first album, Madra (August 1991), was  produced by classical producer Tony Faulkner. It was entirely a cappella, with the songs all based on traditional English verse.  It took only two days to record.

By 1992, Jocelyn West had left the band and was replaced by Donna McKevitt (vocals and viola). More new band members were Ben Golomstock who played guitars and Trevor Sharpe who played drums. On their second release, Iris (1992), the sound evolved into a blend of their madrigal-styled vocal harmonies with sounds reminiscent of folk music, gothic rock, dark wave, ethereal wave, and industrial music. The third album Suspiria came out in March 1993. Kelly McCusker left the band in late 1993 to start a career in classical music. She was replaced by Hepzibah Sessa.

Their sound became increasingly dark and sophisticated over the years. The fourth album, Fairytales of Slavery, was produced by Alexander Hacke of Einstürzende Neubauten. In 1995 the group disbanded.  Katharine Blake formed a new group with Dorothy Carter in 1996, Mediæval Bæbes.  Sharpe later drummed for Minty, Plastic Fantastic and The Servant.

In 1999 they reformed with some new members and released their final album Carnival of Souls in April 2000.

The band reformed in 2022 and play their first reunion show on July 28th at London's 100 Club.

Members
The group's membership changed significantly over time; only Katharine Blake remained in the group for their entire run.

The performers on their last album, Carnival of Souls, were:
 Katharine Blake (vocals, violin, recorders, keyboards,  1991–2000)
 Trevor Sharpe (drums, 1992–2000)
 Ben Golomstock (guitar, 1992–2000)
 Teresa Casella (bass guitar, 2000)
 Mike Servent (keyboards, 2000)
 Barney Hollington (violin and Hammond organ, 2000)

Former members:
 Kelly McCusker (vocals, violin, 1991–1993)
 Jocelyn West (vocals, 1991)
 Donna McKevitt (vocals, viola, 1992–1994)
 Hepzibah Sessa (vocals, keyboards and violin, 1993–1994)
 Kim Fahey (bass guitar, 1994)

Discography

Albums 
 Madra  (1991)
 Iris  (EP, 1992)
 Suspiria  (1993)
 Sunshine  (EP, 1993)
 Fairytales of Slavery  (1994)
 Carnival of Souls  (2000)

Singles 
 "Gush Forth My Tears" (1991)
 "Sunshine" (1993) 
 "Play" (1993)
 "Peepshow" (1994)
 "Tonight" (2000)

References

English gothic rock groups
Musical groups from London
British dark wave musical groups
Musical groups established in 1990
Musical groups disestablished in 2000
Ethereal wave musical groups
Mute Records artists
Dream pop musical groups